Trifid is a quarterly Czech-language periodical and the official publication of Darwiniana, a carnivorous plant society based in the Czech Republic. Typical articles include matters of horticultural interest, field reports, and scientific studies. The journal was established in 1990 as Amatérské Pěstování Masožravých Rostlin (Amateur Growing of Carnivorous Plants) and obtained its current title in 1996. It is published in B5 format, with each issue numbering around 36 pages, of which 24 are in colour.

References

External links 
  
 Back issues of Trifid 
 Back issues of Amatérské Pěstování Masožravých Rostlin 
 List of articles published in APMR and Trifid

Czech-language magazines
Magazines established in 1990
Quarterly magazines
Magazines published in the Czech Republic
Carnivorous plant magazines
1990 establishments in Czechoslovakia